Enriqueta Reza (3 April 1893 – 17 September 1968) was a Mexican actress, performing during the Golden Age of Mexican cinema. She acted in a total of 67 films and won the Ariel Award for A Family Like Many Others in 1950.

Biography 
Enriqueta Reza was born on 3 April 1893. Her first cinema appearance was in 1943 in the movie Toros, Amor y Gloria. She acted in a total of 67 movies. 

In her youth she had established her own theater company and managed to create unforgettable characters for the Mexican scene.

She won the Ariel Award as a best supporting actress in 1950 with the movie Una famila de tantas. Her most notable films were "In the palm of your hand", "La maquerida", "El siete Machos", "Los bandidos de Rio Frio", "El ahijado de la muerte", and "Lluvia roja" The last part she took in a film was during 1968 – "Los recuerdos del porvenir".

Legacy 
Annually, in Mexico, there is a film festival de San Sebastian in which movies from the Golden Age of Mexican Cinema are viewed. Pictures and movies of the actress are presented there in front of the audience.

Filmography

Partial filmography

Ariel Awards

References 

1893 births
1968 deaths
20th-century Mexican actresses
Golden Age of Mexican cinema